Gelechia repetitrix is a moth of the family Gelechiidae. It is found in Asia Minor.

References

Moths described in 1931
Gelechia